The Feltrinelli Prize (from the Italian "Premio Feltrinelli", also known as "International Feltrinelli Prize" or "Antonio Feltrinelli Prize") is an award for achievement in the arts, music, literature, history, philosophy, medicine, and physical and mathematical sciences. Administered by the Antonio Feltrinelli Fund, the award comes with a monetary grant ranging between €50,000 and €250,000, a certificate, and a gold medal.

The prize is awarded, both nationally and internationally, once every five years in each field by Italy's Accademia Nazionale dei Lincei. A further prize is awarded periodically for an exceptional enterprise in moral and humanitarian value. Considered to be Italy's most distinguished scientific society, the organization was founded in 1603 and included Galileo Galilei among its first members.

Award winners 

Source:

 1956 (Mathematics)
 Prize reserved for Italian citizens (L. 1.500.000)
 Beppo Levi
  1957 (Literature)
 Prize reserved for Italian citizens (L. 5.000.000)
 Antonio Baldini 
 Virgilio Giotti
 Vasco Pratolini
 International Prize (L. 20.000.000)
 Wystan Hugh Auden
 Aldo Palazzeschi
 1962 (Literature)
 Prize reserved for Italian citizens
 Bruno Cicognani
 Giuseppe De Robertis
 John Dos Passos
 Carlo Emilio Gadda
 Camillo Sbarbaro
 International Prize
 Eugenio Montale
 1963 (Arts)
 Prize reserved for Italian citizens (L. 5.000.000)
 Painting: Mino Maccari
 Music: Giorgio Federico Ghedini
 Cinema: Luchino Visconti
 International Prize
 Sculpture: Henry Moore
 1964 (Medicine)
 International Prize (L. 25.000.000)
 Experimental medicine: Wallace O. Fenn
 Applied medical and surgical sciences: Albert Sabin
 1966 (Physics, math and natural sciences)
Prize reserved for Italian citizens (L.  5.000.000)
 Mathematics, Mechanics and Applications:  Guido Stampacchia
 Physics, Chemistry and Applications: Luigi Arialdo Radicati di Brozolo
Biology and Applications: Vittorio Capraro
International Prize (L.  20.000.000)
Geology:  Harry Harry Hammond Hess
 1972 (Literature)
 Prize reserved for Italian citizens (L. 10.000.000)
 Narration: Italo Calvino
 History and criticism of literary language: Italo Siciliano
 Theory and history of literary language: Gianfranco Folena
 Poetry: Vittorio Sereni
 International Prize (L. 20.000.000)
 Theatre: Eduardo De Filippo
 1981 
 International Prize (L. 100.000.000)
 Sol Spiegelman
 1984 (Medicine)
 Prize reserved for Italian citizens (L. 25.000.000)
 Ruggero Ceppellini
 International Prize (L. 100.000.000)
 Jérôme Lejeune
 Robert Allan Weinberg
 1986 (Physical, mathematical and natural sciences)
 Prize reserved for Italian citizens (L. 20.000.000)
 Mathematics: Lucilla Bassotti, Claudio Procesi
 Astronomy, geodesy and geophysics: Fernando Sansò
 Physics and chemistry: Giorgio Parisi, Alessandro Ballio, Emilio Gatti
 Geology and paleontology: Maria Bianca Cita Sironi
 Biological science: Lilia Alberghina, Luciano Bullini, Pietro Calissano
 International Prize (L. 100.000.000)
 Chemistry: Alan Battersby
 1989 (Medicine)
 International Prize (L. 100.000.000)
 Giuseppe Attardi
 1990
 International Prize (L. 150.000.000)
 Robert Roswell Palmer
 1991
 International Prize (L. 150.000.000)
 Alfred Edward Ringwood
 1992 (Literature)
 Prize reserved for Italian citizens (L. 50.000.000)
 Luciano Anceschi
 International Prize (L. 200.000.000)
 John Ashbery
 1993 (Arts)
 Prize reserved for Italian citizens (L. 50.000.000)
 Emilio Vedova
 1995
 Prize reserved for Italian citizens (L. 100.000.000)
 Sebastiano Timpanaro
 1998 (Arts)
 Prize reserved for Italian citizens (L. 125.000.000)
 Painting: Carlo Maria Mariani
 Cinema: Michelangelo Antonioni
 Sculpture: Giuliano Vangi
 Theatre: Luigi Squarzina
 International Prize (L. 300.000.000)
 Architecture: José Rafael Moneo Valles
 1999 (Medicine)
 International Prize (L. 300.000.000)
 Arvid Carlsson
 2002 (Literature)
 Prize reserved for Italian citizens (€ 65.000)
 Piero Boitani
 Daniele Del Giudice
 2003 (Arts)
 Prize reserved for Italian citizens (€ 65.000)
 Cinema: Ermanno Olmi
 Photography: Mimmo Jodice
 Orchestra direction: Riccardo Chailly
 Engraving: Guido Strazza
 International Prize (€ 250.000)
 Music: Salvatore Sciarrino
 2004 (Medicine)
 International Prize (€ 250.000)
 Gottfried Schatz
 2006
 Prize reserved for Italian citizens (€ 65.000)
 Alberto Bressan
 Giovanni Jona-Lasinio
 International Prize (€ 250.000)
 Saul Perlmutter
 2007 (Literature)
 International Prize (€ 250.000)
 Brian Stock
 2008 (Arts)
 International Prize (€ 250.000)
 Juha Leiviskä
 2009 (Medicine)
 Prize reserved for Italian citizens (€ 65.000)
 Rino Rappuoli
 International Prize (€ 250.000)
 Ira Pastan
 2011
 Prize reserved for Italian citizens
 Christopher Hacon
 2014 (Medicine)
 International Prize
 Chris Dobson
 2016
 Prize reserved for Italian citizens
 Alberto Mantovani

References

External links 
   

Italian awards
Science and technology awards
Italian science and technology awards